Megathymus is a genus of butterflies in the skipper family, Hesperiidae.

Selected species
Megathymus beulahae 
Megathymus cofaqui (Strecker, 1876)
Megathymus streckeri 
Megathymus texanus 
Megathymus ursus (Poling, 1902)
Megathymus yuccae (Boisduval & Leconte, 1837) – yucca giant-skipper

External links

 Megathymus yuccae, yucca giant-skipper on the UF / IFAS Featured Creatures Web site
Natural History Museum Lepidoptera genus database

Megathyminae
Hesperiidae genera
Taxa named by Samuel Hubbard Scudder